Juan Martín Boselli Duque (born 28 October 1994, in Montevideo) is an Uruguayan footballer who plays as a right winger for Spanish club Albacete Balompié, on loan from Peñarol.

Career
Boselli began playing football in the youth system of Centro Atlético Fénix. After graduating, he had a trial with Segunda División B side Cartagena FC, then managed by compatriot Julio César Ribas. He wasn't able to sign for the club after failing to get a work permit, and instead went out on loan to Uruguayan Primera Division side Juventud de Las Piedras. Boselli had his most successful spell of professional football at Juventud, scoring four goals in 26 league matches. The following season he was recruited by Uruguay's top club Peñarol.

References

External links

1994 births
Living people
Uruguayan sportspeople of Italian descent
Footballers from Montevideo
Uruguayan footballers
Association football wingers
Uruguayan Primera División players
Centro Atlético Fénix players
Juventud de Las Piedras players
Peñarol players
Montevideo Wanderers F.C. players
Segunda División players
Segunda División B players
Real Valladolid Promesas players
Albacete Balompié players
Uruguayan expatriate footballers
Uruguayan expatriate sportspeople in Spain
Expatriate footballers in Spain